Eburicol, or Obtusifoldienol, also called 24-Methylene-24,25-dihydrolanosterol, is a natural, fungus sterol, which can be demethylated by  yeast cytochrome P450 sterol 14alpha-demethylase ERG11.

References

Sterols